The Spider and the Fly was published on January 24, 2017, by Dey Street Books and was written by Claudia Rowe. It chronicles interviews between Rowe and serial killer Kendall Francois also known as "The Poughkeepsie Killer" and "Stinky."

While working for The New York Times, Rowe was assigned to cover the murders of eight women by Francois and interviewed him for five years during which she experienced a strange bond with the killer and eventually conquered her own struggles.  The book is part memoir and part psychological thriller.

References

American memoirs
Non-fiction books about serial killers
Dey Street books
2017 non-fiction books